Genovese sauce is a slow-cooked onion and meat sauce associated with Italy's Campania region, especially Naples  — typically served with paccheri, ziti or candele pasta — and sprinkled with grated cheese.  

Genovese may be prepared with inexpensive cuts of beef, pork, veal or sausage, but typically share and emphasize slow-cooked onions.  A Genovese sauce is always tomato-less. Recipes may cite the ramata di Montoro, a yellow onion with copper-colored skin. 

Likely introduced to Naples from the northern Italian city of Genoa during the Renaissance, Genovese has since become associated with Italy's South, and especially Campania.

History
Despite its name, which means "in the style of Genoa," Genovese sauce is a principal pasta sauce of Naples and an important part of its culinary history, having been introduced to the city in the 15th or 16th centuries. The sauce may have been brought by Genovese immigrants or merchants, at a time when Genoa and Naples were two of Italy's most important ports. It could also be referring to its inventor's name, since Genovese is a widespread surname in Campania. Genovese sauce is now unknown beyond Campania.

The recipe's onions may reflect a French influence, resembling Boeuf à la mode. During the mid 19th century, ‘Salmon in Hollandaise and Genovese sauce’ was served in the Grand Véfour restaurant of the Palais-Royal in Paris as a luxury dish.

Genovese sauce is not to be confused with Pesto from Genoa and Liguria, nor with Salsa Genovese, a red wine and vegetable condiment for fish, nor with the sauce génevoise from Lake Geneva, again served with fish.

Preparation
The sauce is prepared by sautéing either beef or veal with onions, and slowly cooking for two to ten hours. The onions are typically accompanied by minced carrots and celery in what is known as a soffritto.

The slow cooking of the onions is especially important for the sauce's flavor, and is facilitated by incremental additions of white wine, stock, or both. The sauce and accompanying pasta can be served with the meat from the sauce or separately, garnished with tomatoes, and topped with pecorino.  Genovese is typically served with the large, cylindrical pasta, Paccheri, but also rigatoni, ziti or candele — all favored because their shape can hold the sauce.

Ingredients for 4 servings
Meat 600 g, golden onions  1 kg, carrots 60 g, celery 60 g, olive oil.

See also
Bolognese sauce
Neapolitan cuisine

References

Neapolitan cuisine
Italian sauces
Pasta dishes